William Quin (c. 1836 – 13 November 1880) was a plasterer and politician in the colony of South Australia, regarded as the first "worker" to hold such a position.

William Quin was a plasterer with the firm of Webber & Quin of Queenstown in 1857, occasional writer of letters to the editor and well known and respected around the Port, though not so in Wallaroo which, curiously, was then part of the electoral district of Port Adelaide.

He was a leading member of Oddfellows.

He was member of the House of Assembly for Port Adelaide from April 1870 to December 1871 and February 1875 to July 1880. He was forced to retire due to ill health and died of tuberculosis. He was buried in the Woodville Cemetery.

References 

 

Members of the South Australian House of Assembly
1836 births
1880 deaths
19th-century Australian politicians
History of Port Adelaide
People from Queenstown, South Australia